Curyville may refer to:
Curryville, Georgia, an unincorporated community
Curryville, Indiana, an unincorporated community in Adams and Wells counties
Curryville, Sullivan County, Indiana, an unincorporated community 
Curryville, Missouri, a small city
Curryville, New Brunswick